The 2018 Arizona Wildcats football team represented the University of Arizona in the 2018 NCAA Division I FBS football season. The season marked the Wildcats's 119th season. They played their home games at the Arizona Stadium in Tucson, Arizona (for the 90th year) and competed members of the South Division (8th season) in the Pac-12 Conference (41st overall season). They were led by first-year head coach Kevin Sumlin. The Wildcats finished the season 5–7 and did not qualify for a bowl game. They went 4–5 in Pac-12 play, tying USC for third place in the South Division.

Previous season

The 2017 Arizona Wildcats football team finished the regular season with a 7–5, 5–4 in Pac-12 play to finish in third place in the South Division. They were invited to the Foster Farms Bowl where they fell to Purdue, 35–38. Following the conclusion of his sixth season with the Wildcats, head coach Rich Rodriguez was fired.

Offseason

Offseason departures
The Wildcats have 17 senior graduates only graduated players noted until spring practice. As well as one junior who would choose to forgo their senior season in pursuit of an earlier NFL career. The Wildcats would lose four more players from the 2017 team due to various reasons. Notable departures from the 2017 squad included.

Recruiting

On December 20, 2017, NCAA Football started the first ever early signing period which they signed 15 recruits. On the national signing day the Wildcats received 2 more high school recruits tipping off the signing period with a total of 20 high school recruits, 1 walk-on HS recruit, 2 JUCO transfers and 4 college transfers which totals 28 total recruits in the 2018 offseason.

Source:

Incoming transfers
In addition to the 2018 recruiting class, Arizona add two JC transfer players from junior college and six transfer players from college, which includes eligible for the current season, to the 2018 roster:

Position key

Returning starters
Arizona returns 30 starters in 2018, including 15 on offense, 9 on defense, and 5 on special teams.

Offensive starters

Defensive starters

Special Teams starters

† Indicates player was a starter in 2017 but missed all of 2018 due to injury.

Preseason

Award watch lists
Listed in the order that they were released

Pac-12 media poll
The 2018 Pac-12 media days are set for July 25, 2018 in Hollywood, California. Kevin Sumlin (Head coach), Khalil Tate (QB) & Colin Schooler (ILB) at Pac-12 media days. The Pac-12 media poll was released with the Wildcats predicted to finish in third place at Pac-12 South division.

Spring game

The 2018 Wildcats had spring practice on March 19, 2018. The 2018 Arizona football spring game will take place in Tucson, AZ on April 14, 2018, and time to be determined.

Schedule
Arizona announced its 2018 football schedule on November 16, 2017. The 2018 Wildcats' schedule consists of 7 home and 4 away games for the regular season. Arizona will host nine Pac-12 conference opponents California, Colorado, Oregon, USC and arch-rival Arizona State for the 91st annual Territorial Cup to close out the regular season and will travel to UCLA, Utah, Oregon State and Washington State. Arizona is not scheduled to play Pac-12 North opponents Stanford and Washington in the 2018 regular season. The Wildcats bye week comes during week 11 on November 10.

Arizona's out of conference opponents represent the American and Big Sky conferences. The Wildcats will host two non–conference games which are against Southern Utah (first ever meeting) from the Big Sky and BYU (NCAA Division I FBS independent) and travel to Houston from the American.

Personnel

Roster
{| class="toccolours" style="text-align: left;"
|-
| colspan=11 style="; text-align: center;"| 2018 Arizona Wildcats Football
|-
|valign="top"|
Quarterbacks
4 Rhett Rodriguez - Sophomore (6'0, 186)
10 Jamarye Joiner – Freshman (6'1, 210)
11 K’Hari Lane -  Freshman (6'1, 245)
12 Kevin Doyle – Freshman (6'3, 210)
13 Luke Ashworth – Freshman (6'0, 197)
14 Khalil Tate - Junior (6'2, 215)
17 Andrew Tovar -  Freshman (6'2, 169)

Running backs
20 Darrius Smith – Freshman (5'9, 175)
21 J. J. Taylor -  Sophomore (5'6, 180)
23 Gary Brightwell – Sophomore (6'1, 196)
25 Anthony Mariscal –  Junior (5'10, 197)
28 Nazar Bombata  – Freshman (5'11, 195)
33 Nathan Tilford – Sophomore (6'2, 206)
38 Brandon Leon –  Junior (5'8, 201)

Wide Receiver
1 Drew Dixon –  Freshman (6'3, 203)
5 Brian Casteel – Sophomore (6'0, 214)
6 Shun Brown – Senior (5'9, 177) (KR/PR+)
7 DeVaughn Cooper –  Sophomore (5’10, 175)
9 Tony Ellison –  Senior (5'11, 188) (PR+)
16 William Gunnell – Freshman (5'9, 187)
18 Cedric Peterson –  Junior (5'11, 188) (KR+)
19 Shawn Poindexter –  Senior (6'5, 212)
32 Terrence Johnson –  Junior (6'2, 211)
40 Thomas Reid III –  Freshman (6'2, 202)
83 Jailen Bailey – Freshman (5'10, 163)
84 Thomas Marcus – Freshman (6'2, 203)
86 Stanley Berryhill –  Freshman (5'9, 169)
87 Joshua Szott – Freshman (6'2, 182)
88 Tre Adams – Freshman (6'3, 190)
89 Brice Vooletich – Freshman (5'10, 194)

Tight End
80 Zach Peters  – Freshman (6'4, 222)
81 Bryce Wolma - Sophomore (6'3, 239)
82 Zach Williams – Freshman (6'3, 224)
85 Jamie Nunley -  Sophomore (6'5, 230)

Punter
16 Jake Glatting -  Senior (6'3, 218) (H+)
26 Matt Aragon -  Junior (6'5, 211) (WR+)
42 Dylan Klumph - GS Senior (6'3, 230) (H+)
|width="25"| 
|valign="top"|	

Offensive Lineman
50 Josh McCauley –  Sophomore (6'3, 292) (C+)
53 Jon Jacobs –  Sophomore (6'4, 300) (OG+)
54 Bryson Cain –  Sophomore (6'4, 291) (OT+)
58 Layth Friekh –  Senior (6'5, 300) (OT+)
63 Steven Bailey – Junior (6'3, 318) (C+)
64 Nathan Elridge –  Junior (6'7, 297) (C+)
66 Robert Congel –  Freshman (6'3, 315) (OL+)
67 David Watson – Freshman (6'3, 307) (OG+)
70 Thiyo Lukusa –  Sophomore (6'5, 330) (OG+)
72 Edgar Burrola –  Freshman (6'5, 293) (OG+)
73 Tyrell Aponte –  Freshman (6'4, 263) (OL+)
75 Michael Eletise –  Sophomore (6'3, 318) (OT+)
74 Alex Kosinski –  Junior (6'4, 299) (OG+)
76 Cody Creason –  Junior (6'4, 294) (OT+)
78 Donovan Laie – Freshman (6'4, 318)' (OT+)
79 Tyson Gardner –  Freshman (6'3, 277) (OL+)

Defensive lineman
12 JB Brown – Sophomore (6'3, 244) (DE+)
44 Kurtis Brown – Sophomore (6'1, 185) (DT+)
52 P. J. Johnson  –  Junior (6'4, 335) (DT+)
58 Nahe Sulunga – Freshman (6'2, 270) (DT+)
59 My-King Johnson –  Freshman (DE+)
60 Mykee Irving – Freshman (6'3, 337) (DL+)
71 Abraham Maiava –  Junior (6'2, 295) (DL+)
81 Jalen Cochran –  Sophomore (6'3, 249) (DE+)
86 Justin Belknap –  Junior (DE+)
90 Matt Thomas –  Junior (6'1, 274) (DT+)
91 Finton Connolly -  Junior (6'5, 275) (DT+)
94 Sione Taufahema –  Junior (6'1, 330) (DT+)
99 Dereck Boles -  Senior (6'2, 296) (DT+)

Linebackers
1 Tony Fields II – Sophomore (6'1, 225)7 Colin Schooler – Sophomore (6'0, 226)14 Kylan Wilborn – Sophomore (6'2, 245)26 Anthony Pandy – Sophomore (6'0, 225)34 Jacob Colacion –  Sophomore (6'1, 218)45 Issaiah Johnson – Freshman (6'1, 235)47 Rourke Freeburg –  Freshman (6'2, 200)48 Parker Henley –  Freshman (5'11, 222)49 Jalen Harris –  Freshman (6'4, 212)50 Ken Samson –  Freshman (6'1, 212)51 Lee Anderson III – Junior (6'1, 235)53 Richard Merritt –  Freshman (6'0, 216)56 Rexx Tessler –  Freshman (5'9, 209)82 Dante Blissit  – Junior (6'0, 242)Placekicker
30 Josh Pollack -  Senior (5'10, 174)43 Lucas Havrisik - Sophomore (6'2, 173)|width="25"| 
|valign="top"|

Defensive backs
2  Lorenzo Burns -  Sophomore (5'10, 173) (CB+)
3  Jarrius Wallace –  Sophomore (6'1, 180) (S+)
4  Antonio Parks -  Sophomore (5'10, 188) (CB+)
5 Christian Young – Freshman (6'1, 209) (S+)
5 Christian Young – Freshman (6'1, 209) (S+)
6 Demetrius Flannigan-Fowles – Senior (6'2, 205) (S+)
8  Tim Hough – Graduate (5'11, 195) (CB+)
9  Dayven Coleman – Freshman (6'2, 216) (S+)
10 Malcolm Holland -  Sophomore (6'1, 185) (CB+)
11 Troy Young – Sophomore (6'0, 205) (S+)
13 Chacho Ulloa – Junior (5'11, 192) (S+)
15 McKenzie Barnes – Freshman (6'1, 178) (CB+)
17 Jace Whittaker - Senior (5'11, 182) (CB+)
19 Scottie Young Jr. – Sophomore (5'11, 195) (S+)
20 Azizi Hearn -  Freshman (6'1, 187) (CB+)
21 Isaiah Hayes –Junior (6'0, 191) (S+)
23 Malik Hausman -  Freshman (6'0, 170) (CB+)
24 Rhedi Short –  Freshman (6'0, 184) (S+)
27 Sammy Morrison -  Junior (5'10, 177)29 Jacorey Jones  – Freshman (5'11, 155)31 Tristan Cooper – Junior (6'1, 188) (S+)
33 Blake Pfaff  –  Freshman (5'11, 182) (S+)
36 Chandler Gumbs –  Junior (6'1, 207) (S+)
37 Xavier Bell –  Freshman (6'2, 192) (S+)
46 Jimmy Banjoko-Wangjobe – Freshman (6'0, 212) (CB+)
47 Rourke Freeburg –  Freshman (6'2, 200) (S+)

Long Snapper
51  Donald Reiter -  Sophomore (5'10, 235)56  Nick Reinhardt -  Junior (6'1, 240)66  Geno Albini - Freshman (5'11 213)|-
|colspan="7"|Source and player details:
|}

Coaching staff
Arizona's coaching staff has finalized as of February 22, 2018.

Depth chart
Starters and backups.

Depth Chart Source: 2018 Arizona Wildcats Football Fact BookTrue FreshmanDouble Position : *

Game summaries

BYULocation: Arizona Stadium • Tucson, AZDate: September 1, 2018TV: ESPNStatistics

|-
| 2nd || 9:58 || 9 || 59 yards || 4:38 || BYU || Squally Canada 1-yard touchdown run (Skyler Southam kick) || 7 || 0
|-
| 2nd || 5:39 || 12 || 71 yards || 4:19 || ARIZ || Lucas Havrisik 24-yard field goal || 7 || 3
|-
| 2nd || 0:50 || 9 || 77 yards || 2:29 || ARIZ || Tony Ellison 15-yard touchdown pass from Khalil Tate (Havrisik kick) || 7 || 10
|-
| 3rd || 8:25 || 10 || 75 yards || 6:35 || BYU || Matt Bushman 24-yard touchdown pass from Tanner Magnum (Southam kick) || 14 || 10
|-
| 3rd || 4:29 || 9 || 58 yards || 2:35 || BYU || Canada 1-yard touchdown run (Southam kick) || 21 || 10
|-
| 3rd || 1:07 || 5 || 36 yards || 2:14 || BYU || Canada 2-yard touchdown run (Southam kick) || 28 || 10
|-
| 4th || 13:29 || 9 || 75 yards || 2:38 || ARIZ || Tate 2-yard touchdown run (Havrisik kick) || 28 || 17
|-
| 4th || 3:20 || 8 || 67 yards || 1:28 || ARIZ || J. J. Taylor 1-yard touchdown run (Tate two-point conversion pass failed) || 28 || 23

To open up the 2018 season, Arizona hosted the BYU Cougars for the non-conference home opener in Tucson. Arizona lost the previous meeting in Glendale to BYU, 16–18. Arizona leads the all-time series with 12–10.

at HoustonLocation: TDECU Stadium • Houston, TXDate: September 8, 2018TV: ABCStatistics

|-
| 1st || 12:13 || 10 || 81 yards || 2:47 || HOU || Marquez Stevenson 24-yard touchdown pass from D'Eriq King (Dalton Witherspoon kick) || 0 || 7
|-
| 1st || 8:29 || 4 || 40 yards || 0:49 || HOU || King 1-yard touchdown run (Witherspoon kick) || 0 || 14
|-
| 1st || 4:43 || 5 || 63 yards || 1:12 || HOU || Romello Brooker 52-yard touchdown pass from King (Witherspoon kick) || 0 || 21
|-
| 2nd || 12:38 || 12 || 47 yards || 2:52 || HOU || Witherspoon 35-yard field goal || 0 || 24
|-
| 2nd || 3:44 || 9 || 75 yards || 1:53 || HOU || Bryson Smith 13-yard touchdown pass from King (Witherspoon kick) || 0 || 31
|-
| 3rd || 12:09 || 6 || 64 yards || 1:35 || HOU || Keith Corbin 18-yard touchdown pass from King (Witherspoon kick) || 0 || 38
|-
| 3rd || 3:16 || 9 || 49 yards || 3:05 || ARIZ || Lucas Havrisik 49-yard field goal || 3 || 38
|-
| 3rd || 0:11 || 6 || 74 yards || 1:47 || ARIZ || Darrius Smith 1-yard touchdown run (Havrisik kick) || 10 || 38
|-
| 4th || 11:05 || 10 || 75 yards || 3:22 || ARIZ || Khalil Tate 2-yard touchdown run (Havrisik kick failed) || 16 || 38
|-
| 4th || 6:35 || 1 || -1 yrd || 0:06 || ARIZ || Team safety || 18 || 38
|-
| 4th || 1:48 || 6 || 95 yards || 3:17 || HOU || King 4-yard touchdown run (Witherspoon kick) || 18 || 45

After losing to BYU to begin the season. Arizona traveled to Houston to face the Cougars. It was the second straight game that the Wildcats played an opponent that was nicknamed the Cougars. Arizona lost the previous meeting to Houston, 16–19 in Tucson last season. Arizona trails the all-time series by Houston with 1–2.

Southern UtahLocation: Arizona Stadium • Tucson, AZDate: September 15, 2018TV: P12NStatistics

|-
| 1st || 9:42 || 5 || 80 yards || 1:25 || ARIZ || Tony Ellison 17-yard touchdown pass from Khalil Tate (Lucas Havrisik kick) || 0 || 7
|-
| 2nd || 14:56 || 7 || 41 yards || 2:59 || SU || Manny Berz 33-yard field goal || 3 || 7
|-
| 2nd || 14:42 || 0 || 0 yards || 0:00 || ARIZ || J. J. Taylor 84-yard kickoff return touchdown (Havrisik kick) || 3 || 14
|-
| 2nd || 9:27 || 13 || 75 yards || 5:15 || SU || Jay Green Jr. 10-yard touchdown run (Berz kick) || 10 || 14
|-
| 2nd || 7:41 || 6 || 45 yards || 1:40 || ARIZ || Havrisik 32-yard field goal || 10 || 17
|-
| 2nd || 2:39 || 13 || 75 yards || 5:02 || SU || Chris Helbig 2-yard touchdown run (Berz kick) || 17 || 17
|-
| 2nd || 0:23 || 8 || 67 yards || 2:08 || ARIZ || Shun Brown 11-yard touchdown pass from Tate (Havrisik kick) || 17 || 24
|-
| 3rd || 12:56 || 5 || 67 yards || 1:55 || ARIZ || Cedric Peterson 2-yard touchdown pass from Tate (Havrisik kick) || 17 || 31
|-
| 3rd || 10:17 || 6 || 53 yards || 1:49 || ARIZ || Havrisik 35-yard field goal || 17 || 34
|-
| 3rd || 8:14 || 3 || 66 yards || 0:53 || ARIZ || Brown 65-yard touchdown pass from Tate (Havrisik kick) || 17 || 41
|-
| 3rd || 1:47 || 4 || 98 yards || 1:42 || ARIZ || Shawn Poindexter 75-yard touchdown pass from Tate (Havrisik kick) || 17 || 48
|-
| 4th || 12:33 || 14 || 75 yards || 4:14 || SUU || Helbig 2-yard touchdown run (Berz kick) || 24 || 48
|-
| 4th || 9:50 || 6 || 69 yards || 2:42 || ARIZ || Anthony Mariscal 33-yard touchdown run (Havrisik kick) || 24 || 55
|-
| 4th || 8:51 || 3 || 21 yards || 0:50 || ARIZ || Branden Leon 1-yard touchdown run (Havrisik kick) || 24 || 62
|-
| 4th || 4:57 || 10 || 75 yards || 3:54 || SUU || Frank Harris III 23-yard touchdown pass from Helbig (Manny Berz kick) || 31 || 62
|-

After playing Houston, Arizona hosted the Southern Utah Thunderbirds for third and final non-conference game of the season. This was the first ever meeting between the two schools. Arizona won to give Sumlin his first win as a Wildcat coach.

at Oregon StateLocation: Reser Stadium • Corvallis, ORDate: September 22, 2018TV: P12NStatistics

|-
| 1st || 12:37 || 5 || 58 yards || 1:18 || ARIZ || J. J. Taylor 40-yard touchdown run (Lucas Havrisik kick) || 7 || 0
|-
| 1st || 0:56 || 13 || 85 yards || 5:13 || ORST || Trevon Bradford 8-yard touchdown pass from Conor Blount (Jordan Choukair kick) || 7 || 7
|-
| 2nd || 8:25 || 10 || 90 yards || 4:26 || ARIZ || Shun Brown 21-yard touchdown pass from Khalil Tate (Havrisik kick) || 14 || 7
|-
| 3rd || 10:39 || 12 || 75 yards || 4:21 || ARIZ || Shawn Poindexter 16-yard touchdown pass from Tate (Havrisik kick) || 21 || 7
|-
| 4th || 13:25 || 9 || 94 yards || 3:32 || ARIZ || Gary Brightwell 8-yard touchdown run (Havrisik kick) || 28 || 7
|-
| 4th || 6:54 || 13 || 75 yards || 6:29 || ORST || Timmy Hernandez 25-yard touchdown pass from Blount (Jordan Choukair kick) || 28 || 14
|-
| 4th || 5:26 || 3 || 75 yards || 1:28 || ARIZ || Taylor 62-yard touchdown run (Lucas Havrisik kick) || 35 || 14
|-

After defeating Southern Utah at home for Sumlin's first win as coach, Arizona opened the Pac-12 regular season on the road at Corvallis against Oregon State. Arizona won the previous meeting over Oregon State 49–28 at Tucson last season. Arizona leads the all-time series over Oregon State at 23–15–1.

USCLocation: Arizona Stadium • Tucson, AZDate: September 29, 2018TV: ESPN2Statistics

|-
| 1st || 5:52 || 12 || 80 yards || 4:40 || USC || Vavae Malepeai 1-yard touchdown run (Michael Brown kick) || 7 || 0
|-
| 2nd || 11:12 || 4 || 8 yards || 2:20 || USC || Brown 42-yard field goal || 10 || 0
|-
| 2nd || 5:08 || 8 || 65 yards || 5:12 || USC || Aca'Cedric Ware 26-yard touchdown run (Brown kick) || 17 || 0
|-
| 3rd || 10:36 || 4 || 70 yards || 2:06 || USC || Ware 69-yard touchdown run (Brown kick) || 24 || 0
|-
| 3rd || 7:44 || 7 || 84 yards || 2:52 || ARIZ || Stanley Berryhill 33-yard touchdown pass from Khalil Tate (Lucas Havrisik kick) || 24 || 7
|-
| 4th || 9:34 || 1 || 32 yards || 0:08 || ARIZ || Cedric Peterson 32-yard touchdown pass from Tate (Lucas Havrisik kick) || 24 || 14
|-
| 4th || 1:40 || 8 || 65 yards || 2:23 || ARIZ || Gary Brightwell 1-yard touchdown run (Havrisik kick failed) || 24 || 20
|-

After winning its first Pac-12 game of the season against Oregon State on the road, Arizona faced USC in Arizona's family weekend game in Tucson. The Wildcats have lost four games in a row to the Trojans. UA lost 38–31 in 2013, 38–30 in 2015, and last previous meeting 49–35 at Los Angeles in 2017, and 28–26 at Tucson in 2014 in a close games. Arizona's last win in the series came in 2012 in Tucson. Arizona trails the all-time series by USC with 8–32.

CaliforniaLocation: Arizona Stadium • Tucson, AZDate: October 6, 2018TV: FS1Statistics

|-
| 1st || 9:42 || 11 || 75 yards || 5:18 || ARIZ || Tony Ellison 31-yard touchdown pass from Khalil Tate (Josh Pollack kick) || 0 || 7
|-
| 1st || 1:49 || 9 || 36 yards || 3:19 || ARIZ || Pollack 46-yard field goal || 0 || 10
|-
| 2nd || 14:02 || 7 || 75 yards || 2:47 || CAL || Brandon McIlwain 25-yard touchdown run (Greg Thomas kick) || 7 || 10
|-
| 2nd || 0:41 || 7 || 75 yards || 2:13 || CAL || McIlwain 23-yard touchdown run (Thomas kick) || 14 || 10
|-
| 3rd || 3:19 || 6 || 20 yards || 2:40 || ARIZ || Azizi Hearn 34-yard fumble return touchdown (Pollack kick) || 14 || 17
|-
| 4th || 3:13 || 1 || 0 yards || 0:08 || ARIZ || Scottie Young Jr. 24-yard interception return touchdown (Pollack kick) || 14 || 24
|-
| 4th || 0:16 || 10 || 57 yards || 2:57 || CAL || Thomas 35-yard field goal || 17 || 24
|-

After losing against USC at home, Arizona played again at home facing California in Tucson. In the previous meeting, Arizona won over California 45–44 in double overtime in Berkeley and captured a 49–45 crazy comeback win in Tucson in 2014. Arizona leads the all-time series lead over California with 17–14–2. The Golden Bears have not defeated the Wildcats since 2009 and has not won in Tucson since 2004.

The first half was a low-scoring affair. Arizona would score a pair of defensive touchdowns to get the win.

at UtahLocation: Rice-Eccles Stadium • Salt Lake City, UTDate: October 12, 2018TV: ESPNStatistics

|-
| 1st || 7:47 || 15 || 75 yards || 7:13 || UTAH || Samson Nacua 8-yard touchdown pass from Tyler Huntley (Matt Gay kick) || 0 || 7
|-
| 1st || 2:47 || 8 || 69 yards || 3:23 || UTAH || Zack Moss 1-yard touchdown run (Gay kick) || 0 || 14
|-
| 2nd || 10:39 || 3 || 83 yards || 1:07 || UTAH || Demari Simpkins 68-yard touchdown pass from Huntley (Gay kick) || 0 || 21
|-
| 2nd || 1:56 || 9 || 58 yards || 4:34 || UTAH || Huntley 3-yard touchdown run (Gay kick) || 0 || 28
|-
| 3rd || 13:12 || 2 || 67 yards || 0:42 || UTAH || Huntley 58-yard touchdown pass from Britain Covey (Gay kick) || 0 || 35
|-
| 3rd || 9:16 || 11 || 56 yards || 3:56 || ARIZ || Josh Pollack 37-yard field goal || 3 || 35
|-
| 4th || 13:23 || 7 || 93 yards || 1:50 || ARIZ || Cedric Peterson 42-yard touchdown pass from Rhett Rodriguez (Pollack kick)  || 10 || 35
|-
| 4th || 6:14 || 5 || 68 yards || 1:57 || UTAH || Armand Shyne 22-yard touchdown run (Gay kick) || 10 || 42
|-

After defeating the California Golden Bears at home, Arizona traveled to Salt Lake City and faced the Utah Utes. The Wildcats lost the previous meeting to Utah 24–30 in last season at Tucson. Arizona last defeated the Utes in 2015 in Tucson and trails the all-time series by Utah, 19–22–2.

at UCLALocation: Rose Bowl • Pasadena, CADate: October 20, 2018TV: ESPN2Statistics

|-
| 1st || 9:51 || 9 || 62 yards || 4:11 || UCLA || Kazmeir Allen 16-yard touchdown pass from Dorian Thompson-Robinson (J.J. Molson kick) || 0 || 7
|-
| 2nd || 14:56 || 7 || 53 yards || 3:22 || UCLA || Molson 40-yard field goal || 0 || 10
|-
| 2nd || 6:38 || 5 || 71 yards || 2:00 || ARIZ || Shawn Poindexter 13-yard touchdown pass from Rhett Rodriguez (Josh Pollack kick) || 7 || 10
|-
| 2nd || 1:34 || 13 || 75 yards || 5:04 || UCLA || Devin Asiasi 24-yard touchdown pass from Wilton Speight (Molson kick) || 7 || 17
|-
| 3rd || 10:16 || 9 || 71 yards || 3:09 || ARIZ || Pollack 39-yard field goal || 10 || 17
|-
| 3rd || 7:44 || 3 || 15 yards || 1:14 || ARIZ || Poindexter 11-yard touchdown pass from Rodriguez (Pollack kick) || 17 || 17
|-
| 3rd || 4:58 || 5 || 66 yards || 1:53 || ARIZ || Pollack 39-yard field goal || 20 || 17
|-
| 3rd || 3:08 || 6 || 75 yards || 1:50 || UCLA || Demetric Felton 25-yard touchdown pass from Speight (Molson kick) || 20 || 24
|-
| 4th || 12:34 || 8 || 72 yards || 2:47 || ARIZ || J. J. Taylor 1-yard touchdown run (Pollack kick) || 27 || 24
|-
| 4th || 11:33 || 4 || 75 yards || 1:01 || UCLA || Joshua Kelley 28-yard touchdown run (Molson kick) || 27 || 31
|-
| 4th || 6:28 || 11 || 63 yards || 5:05 || ARIZ || Pollack 29-yard field goal || 30 || 31
|-

After losing to Utah on the road, Arizona faced UCLA on the road at Rose Bowl in Pasadena. Arizona defeated the Bruins in the previous meeting 47–30 last season in Tucson. Arizona trails the all-time series by UCLA, 16–24–2.

OregonLocation: Arizona Stadium • Tucson, AZDate: October 27, 2018TV: ESPNStatistics

|-
| 1st || 11:08 || 7 || 75 yards || 2:03 || ARIZ || Shawn Poindexter 22-yard touchdown pass from Khalil Tate (Josh Pollack kick) || 0 || 7
|-
| 1st || 4:52 || 4 || 69 yards || 3:23 || ARIZ || Pollack 34-yard field goal || 0 || 10
|-
| 2nd || 12:43 || 8 || 83 yards || 1:07 || ARIZ || Pollack 32-yard field goal || 0 || 13
|-
| 2nd || 11:30 || 4 || 58 yards || 4:34 || ARIZ || Pollack 23-yard field goal || 0 || 16
|-
| 2nd || 9:17 || 7 || 67 yards || 0:42 || ORE || Dillon Mitchell 29-yard touchdown pass from Justin Herbert (Herbert two-point conversion run) || 8 || 16
|-
| 2nd || 1:39 || 18 || 56 yards || 3:56 || ARIZ || J. J. Taylor 1-yard touchdown run (Pollack kick) || 8 || 23
|-
| 3rd || 10:30 || 7 || 93 yards || 1:50 || ARIZ || Poindexter 8-yard touchdown pass from Tate (Pollack kick) || 8 || 30
|-
| 3rd || 2:49 || 5 || 68 yards || 1:57 || ARIZ || Shun Brown 27-yard touchdown pass from Tate (Pollack kick) || 8 || 37
|-
| 4th || 9:17 || 14 || 93 yards || 1:50 || ORE || Brenden Schooler 7-yard touchdown pass from Herbert (Adam Stack kick) || 15 || 37
|-
| 4th || 3:32 || 10 || 68 yards || 1:57 || ARIZ || J. J. Taylor 19-yard touchdown run (Pollack kick) || 15 || 44
|-

Following its close loss to UCLA on the road, Arizona returned home against 19th-ranked Oregon in the homecoming game. The Ducks defeated the Wildcats 48–28 in the previous meeting on the road at Eugene. Arizona trails the all-time series to Oregon, 26–16.

ColoradoLocation: Arizona Stadium • Tucson, AZDate: November 2, 2018TV: FS1Statistics

|-
| 1st || 5:35 || 11 || 66 yards || 4:19 || COLO || K.D. Nixon 8-yard touchdown run (Tyler Francis kick) || 7 || 0
|-
| 1st || 3:56 || 4 || -1 yards || 1:26 || COLO || Francis 25-yard field goal || 10 || 0
|-
| 2nd || 14:33 || 11 || 44 yards || 4:22 || ARIZ || Lucas Havrisik 49-yard field goal || 10 || 3
|-
| 2nd || 10:33 || 4 || 62 yards || 1:29 || ARIZ || Stanley Berryhill 40-yard touchdown pass from Khalil Tate (Pollack kick) || 10 || 10
|-
| 2nd || 6:15 || 8 || 82 yards || 2:43 || ARIZ || Shawn Poindexter 1-yard touchdown pass from Tate (Pollack kick) || 10 || 17
|-
| 2nd || 2:50 || 9 || 89 yards || 3:20 || COLO || Kyle Evans 17-yard touchdown pass from Steven Montez (Francis kick) || 17 || 17
|-
| 2nd || 0:59 || 6 || 75 yards || 1:51 || ARIZ || Shun Brown 12-yard touchdown pass from Tate (Pollack kick failed) || 17 || 23
|-
| 2nd || 0:33 || 4 || 75 yards || 0:26 || COLO || Travon McMillian 57-yard touchdown pass from Montez (Francis kick) || 24 || 23
|-
| 2nd || 0:00 || 4 || 21 yards || 0:25 || ARIZ || Havrisik 55-yard field goal || 24 || 26
|-
| 3rd || 9:26 || 11 || 75 yards || 5:34 || COLO || Tony Brown 20-yard touchdown pass from Montez (Francis kick) || 31 || 26
|-
| 3rd || 7:11 || 5 || 66 yards || 2:07 || ARIZ || Poindexter 39-yard touchdown pass from Tate (Tate two-point conversion pass failed) || 31 || 32
|-
| 3rd || 9:17 || 9 || 62 yards || 3:34 || ARIZ || Havrisik 41-yard field goal || 31 || 35
|-
| 3rd || 2:39 || 7 || 44 yards || 2:39 || COLO || Tyler Francis 48-yard field goal || 34 || 35
|-
| 4th || 13:04 || 4 || 85 yards || 1:51 || ARIZ || Cedric Peterson 57-yard touchdown pass from Tate (Pollack kick) || 34 || 42
|-

After dominating Oregon in an upset win, the Wildcats remained at home against the Colorado Buffaloes in Tucson, AZ. In previous season, Arizona defeated Colorado 45–42 in Boulder in a game where quarterback Khalil Tate broke the NCAA single-game record for most rushing yards. Colorado won the previous meeting in Tucson, 49–24, in 2016. Arizona trails the all-time series to Colorado at 5–14.

at Washington StateLocation: Martin Stadium • Pullman, WADate: November 17, 2018TV: ESPNStatistics

|-
| 1st || 10:44 || 9 || 75 yards || 4:16 || WSU || James Williams 1-yard touchdown run (Blake Mazza kick) || 0 || 7
|-
| 1st || 7:38 || 6 || 53 yards || 1:48 || WSU || Max Borghi 1-yard touchdown run (Mazza kick) || 0 || 14
|-
| 1st || 3:19 || 6 || 70 yards || 1:59 || ARIZ || Shawn Poindexter 24-yard touchdown pass from Khalil Tate (Lucas Havrisik kick) || 7 || 14
|-
| 1st || 0:19 || 6 || 49 yards || 3:00 || WSU || Calvin Jackson Jr. 27-yard touchdown pass from Gardner Minshew (Mazza kick) || 7 || 21
|-
| 2nd || 12:03 || 5 || 79 yards || 2:06 || WSU || Dezmon Patton 11-yard touchdown pass from Minshew (Mazza kick) || 7 || 28
|-
| 2nd || 10:43 || 4 || 73 yards || 1:20 || ARIZ || Tony Ellison 37-yard touchdown pass from Tate (Havrisik kick) || 14 || 28
|-
| 2nd || 7:08 || 7 || 75 yards || 3:35 || WSU || Jackson 6-yard touchdown pass from Minshew (Mazza kick failed) || 14 || 34
|-
| 2nd || 7:04 || 0 || -1 yard || 0:04 || WSU || Kainoa Wilson fumble recovery touchdown in end zone (Mazza kick) || 14 || 41
|-
| 2nd || 3:22 || 6 || 54 yards || 2:32 || WSU || Williams 9-yard touchdown pass from Minshew (Mazza kick) || 14 || 48
|-
| 2nd || 0:10 || 2 || 80 yards || 0:30 || WSU || Davontavean Martin 50-yard touchdown pass from Minshew (Mazza kick) || 14 || 55
|-
| 3rd || 12:18 || 8 || 75 yards || 2:42 || ARIZ || Shun Brown 2-yard touchdown pass from Tate (Havrisik kick) || 21 || 55
|-
| 3rd || 1:02 || 11 || 80 yards || 3:52 || ARIZ || Poindexter 14-yard touchdown pass from Tate (Havrisik kick) || 28 || 55
|-
| 4th || 12:37 || 9 || 75 yards || 3:25 || WSU || Jamire Calvin 2-yard touchdown pass from Minshew (Mazza kick) || 28 || 62
|-
| 4th || 7:06 || 7 || 75 yards || 3:02 || WSU || Easop Winston 9-yard touchdown pass from Minshew (Mazza kick) || 28 || 69
|-

After their win over Colorado, the Wildcats traveled to Pullman to face eighth-ranked Washington State in their final road game of the season. Arizona defeated Washington State in Tucson in the previous year. After a 21–7 start, the Cougars’ powerful offense exploded for 34 second quarter points, leading 55–14 at halftime, and cruising to a 41-point victory. It was the second straight time that the Wildcats went to Washington State and lost by giving up 69 points (they were destroyed by a 69–7 score in 2016) and the third loss of the season to a team named the Cougars (they lost to BYU and Houston to start the year). Arizona leads the all-time series lead over Washington State at 27–17.

Arizona State (Territorial Cup)Location: Arizona Stadium • Tucson, AZDate: November 24, 2018TV: FS1Statistics

|-
| 1st || 7:06 || 9 || 86 yards || 3:47 || ARIZ || Josh Pollack 29-yard field goal || 0 || 3
|-
| 1st || 3:33 || 6 || 78 yards || 1:45 || ARIZ || Tony Ellison 28-yard touchdown pass from Khalil Tate (Pollack kick) || 0 || 10
|-
| 1st || 2:28 || 3 || 75 yards || 1:05 || ASU || Brandon Aiyuk 58-yard touchdown pass from Manny Wilkins (Brandon Ruiz kick) || 7 || 10
|-
| 2nd || 10:18 || 5 || 21 yards || 2:12 || ARIZ || Pollack 23-yard field goal || 7 || 13
|-
| 2nd || 4:25 || 9 || 70 yards || 4:13 || ARIZ || Shawn Poindexter 23-yard touchdown pass from Tate (Tate two-point conversion run failed) || 7 || 19
|-
| 2nd || 1:27 || 9 || 75 yards || 2:58 || ASU || Eno Benjamin 10-yard touchdown run (Ruiz kick) || 14 || 19
|-
| 2nd || 0:00 || 6 || 44 yards || 1:18 || ARIZ || Pollack 36-yard field goal || 14 || 22
|-
| 3rd || 13:14 || 2 || -8 yards || 0:30 || ARIZ || Team safety || 14 || 24
|-
| 3rd || 12:17 || 4 || 3 yards || 0:46 || ARIZ || Pollack 40-yard field goal || 14 || 27
|-
| 3rd || 9:23 || 5 || 65 yards || 2:54 || ASU || Benjamin 14-yard touchdown run (Ruiz kick) || 21 || 27
|-
| 3rd || 7:51 || 4 || 75 yards || 1:32 || ARIZ || Gary Brightwell 35-yard touchdown run (Tate two-point conversion pass failed) || 21 || 33
|-
| 3rd || 2:44 || 9 || 58 yards || 3:26 || ARIZ || Ellison 8-yard touchdown pass from Tate (Pollack kick) || 21 || 40
|-
| 4th || 13:05 || 12 || 66 || 4:39 || ASU || Ruiz 27-yard field goal || 24 || 40
|-
| 4th || 6:36 || 8 || 80 yards || 2:25 || ASU || Wilkins 11-yard touchdown run (Tommy Hudson two-point conversion pass from Wilkins) || 32 || 40
|-
| 4th || 3:33 || 4 || 1 yard || 1:26 || ASU || Ruiz 39-yard field goal || 35 || 40
|-
| 4th || 3:08 || 1 || 22 yards || 0:07 || ASU || Benjamin 22-yard touchdown run (Wilkins two-point conversion pass failed) || 41 || 40
|-

After being blown out by Washington State on the road, Arizona closed out the season and faced its arch-rivals, the Arizona State Sun Devils, in the 92nd meeting of the "Territorial Cup" in Tucson. Arizona lost to ASU in the previous meeting in Tempe, 42–30. The Wildcats defeated the Sun Devils 56–35 in Tucson in 2016. Arizona leads the all-time series over ASU at 49–41–1.

This game featured one of the most biggest comebacks/collapses in Arizona football history. The Wildcats, needing a win to become bowl-eligible, dominated ASU for the first three quarters to lead 40–21 going into the fourth. However, Arizona, feeling like the game was over due to their 19-point lead, began to play conservatively by draining the clock, which led to being prone to turnovers, which seemed to motivate Arizona State. The Devils capitalized on the Wildcats’ errors and scored 20 points to take the lead with over three minutes left. The Wildcats drove down the field in the final minute to possibly regain but missed a field goal attempt and the Territorial Cup remained in the Phoenix area for another year. The Wildcats ended the season with a record of 5–7 (4–5 in Pac-12 play).

Many fans blamed Sumlin and the coaching staff for the loss by calling more running plays than passing ones in the final quarter. Sumlin said that the team wanted to run the ball more to drain more time to keep the lead, but that doing so would lead to mistakes. He also believed that the loss affected the program, particularly in recruiting, which led to mixed results on the field and a period of futility, in which it became a factor in Sumlin's firing after the 2020 season.

Rankings

Preseason polls 

In-season polls

Statistics

Team

Non-conference opponents

Pac-12 opponents

Score total by Quarters

Offense
Rushing
Note: G = Games played; ATT = Attempts; YDS = Yards; AVG = Average yard per carry; LG = Longest run; TD = Rushing touchdowns

Passing
Note: G = Games played; COMP = Completions; ATT = Attempts; COMP % = Completion percentage; YDS = Passing yards; TD = Passing touchdowns; INT = Interceptions; EFF = Passing efficiency

Receiving
Note: G = Games played; REC = Receptions; YDS = Yards; AVG = Average yard per catch; LG = Longest catch; TD = Receiving touchdowns

Defense
Note: G = Games played; Solo = Solo tackles; Ast = Assisted tackles; Total = Total tackles; TFL-Yds = Tackles for loss-yards lost; Sack = Sacks; INT = Interceptions; PD = Passes defended; FF = Forced fumbles; FR = Forced recoveries

Special teams
Kick and punt returningNote: G = Games played; PR = Punt returns; PYDS = Punt return yards; PLG = Punt return long; KR = Kick returns; KYDS = Kick return yards; KLG = Kick return long; TD = Total return touchdownsKickingNote: G = Games played; FGM = Field goals made; FGA = Field goals attempted; LG = Field goal long; XPT = Extra points made; XPT ATT = XPT attempted; In20 = Kicking inside the 20; 20-29 = Kicking inside the 20-29; 30-39 = Kicking inside the 30-39; 40-49 = Kicking inside the 40-49; 50 = Kicking inside the 50; TP = Total pointsPuntingNote: G = Games played; P = Punts; YDS = Yards; AVG = Average per punt; LG = Punt long; In20 = Punts inside the 20; TB = TouchbacksAwards and honors

Midseason award watch lists

Weekly awards
 Khalil Tate
 Pac-12 Rose Bowl Player of the Week, week 3 vs Southern Utah
 J. J. Taylor
 Pac-12 Offensive Player of the Week, week 4 vs Oregon State

All-Americans 
 J. J. Taylor, RB  – AP Third Team

All-Pac-12 Teams
3rd Team

 J. J. Taylor, Running Back (AP-3)

Postseason

Bowl game

Senior Bowl

All Star Game

2019 NFL draft

Team players drafted into the NFL

Media affiliates

Radio

ESPN Radio – (ESPN Tucson 1490 AM & 104.09 FM) – Nationwide (Dish Network, Sirius XM, TuneIn radio and iHeartRadio)
KCUB 1290 AM – Football Radio Show – (Tucson, AZ)
KHYT – 107.5 FM (Tucson, AZ)
KTKT 990 AM – La Hora de Los Gatos (Spanish)'' – (Tucson, AZ)
KGME 910 AM – (IMG Sports Network) – (Phoenix, AZ)
KTAN 1420 AM – (Sierra Vista, AZ)
KDAP 96.5 FM (Douglas, Arizona)
KWRQ 102.3 FM – (Safford, AZ/Thatcher, AZ)
KIKO 1340 AM – (Globe, AZ)
KVWM 970 AM – (Show Low, AZ/Pinetop-Lakeside, AZ)
XENY 760 – (Nogales, Sonora) (Spanish)

TV 
CBS Family - KOLD (CBS), CBSN
ABC/ESPN Family - KGUN (ABC), ABC, ESPN, ESPN2, ESPNU, ESPN+,
FOX Family - KMSB (FOX), FOX/FS1, FSN
Pac-12 Network (Pac-12 Arizona)

References

Arizona
Arizona Wildcats football seasons
Arizona Wildcats football